Stanley K. Tanger (April 13, 1923 – October 23, 2010) was an American businessman, philanthropist and pioneer of the outlet shopping industry. Tanger founded Tanger Factory Outlet Centers, which began with a single location in Burlington, North Carolina in 1981, and now has 45 shopping centers throughout the United States and Canada as of April 2015. In doing so, he invented "the very concept of the outlet mall", according to the News & Record of Greensboro, North Carolina. Tanger Outlets grossed $270 million in 2009.

Biography
Tanger was the son of Harriette and Moe Tanger, who were from Wallingford, Connecticut. Tanger served as a pilot during World War II. After World War II, Tanger began to run Creighton Shirtmakers, the family business in Reidsville, North Carolina. Under Tanger, Creighton Shirtmakers expanded to five outlet stores. Tanger soon organized other similar businesses and manufacturer outlets into a small, brand name outlet strip mall in Burlington, North Carolina in the early 1981.

The company, now known as Tanger Factory Outlet Centers, had since expanded to more than forty-one outlet centers in twenty-five U.S. states and four in Canada, as of April 2015. In 1993, Tanger Factory Outlet Centers became the first outlet developer to be publicly traded on the New York Stock Exchange.

Real Estate by Inc. Magazine named Tanger as "Entrepreneur of the Year" in 1994. Tanger remained chairman of Tanger's board of directors until his retirement from a daily role with the company on August 7, 2009. He resigned as chairman of the board in September 2009, but remained a member of Tanger's board of directors until his death in 2010.

Tanger and his wife, Doris Tanger, a breast cancer survivor,
 were local, North Carolina philanthropists. Much of Tanger's philanthropy focused on breast cancer awareness, including a one-million-dollar contribution to Moses Cone Health System's Regional Cancer Center in Greensboro. Tanger also funded a variety of beautification projects throughout the city of Greensboro, including the creation and preservation of city parks, including the Bicentennial Gardens.

Stanley Tanger, a resident of Greensboro, died of pneumonia on October 23, 2010, aged 87. He was survived by his wife of sixty-three years, Doris Tanger, and his children and grandchildren. Tanger's funeral was held at Temple Emanuel, a Reform Judaism congregation in Greensboro. His son, Steven, was named president and CEO of Tanger Factory Outlet Centers in January 2010.

References

1923 births
2010 deaths
Jewish American military personnel
Jewish American philanthropists
Businesspeople from Greensboro, North Carolina
American military personnel of World War II
Deaths from pneumonia in North Carolina
American World War II pilots
20th-century American businesspeople
20th-century American philanthropists
21st-century American Jews